WIKE (1490 AM) is a commercial radio station located in Newport, Vermont. It is owned by Vermont Broadcast Associates, Inc. and it broadcasts a classic rock format, simulcast from 106.3 WMTK in Littleton, New Hampshire.  Both stations call themselves "The Notch." WIKE's programming is also heard on translator station W276DK (103.1 FM) in Derby Center.

History
On October 12, 1952, WIKE first signed on.  It was owned by Memphremagog Broadcasting and was powered at 250 watts.  In the 1960s, the daytime power was boosted to 1,000 watts and in the 1980s, it also increased its nighttime power to 1,000 watts.

In 1991, an FM station was added, 92.1 WMOO, which is licensed to nearby Derby Center.  WMOO is programmed with a hot adult contemporary format.  In 2001, both stations were acquired by Northstar Media, Inc for just over $1 million.

During most of the early 2000s, WIKE was a country music station, switching to classic rock in the mid 2010s.

On May 22, 2012, WIKE, along with 29 other Nassau Broadcasting Partners stations in Northern New England, was purchased at a bankruptcy auction by Carlisle Capital Corporation, a company controlled by Bill Binnie (owner of WBIN-TV in Derry).  WIKE, and 12 of the other stations, were then acquired by Vertical Capital Partners, controlled by Jeff Shapiro.

Soon after taking over, Vertical resold WIKE and sister station 92.1 WMOO to Vermont Broadcast Associates.

The sale of WIKE and the other 12 stations was consummated on November 30, 2012, at a purchase price of $4.4 million. The resale of WIKE and WMOO was consummated on January 1, 2013, at a purchase price of $760,000.

Translator

References

External links

IKE
Classic rock radio stations in the United States
Newport (city), Vermont
Orleans County, Vermont
Radio stations established in 1952
1952 establishments in Vermont